Dr. Joseph Richards represented Dedham, Massachusetts in the Great and General Court. Beginning in 1731, he served five terms as selectman.

He married the daughter of Rev. Joseph Belcher but did not get along with Belcher's successor, Samuel Dexter. He was one of the richest men in Dedham and a Lt. Colonel in the Suffolk Regiment. Richards was graduated from Harvard College in 1721.

References

Works cited

Military personnel from Dedham, Massachusetts
Members of the colonial Massachusetts General Court from Dedham
Year of birth missing
Year of death missing
Dedham, Massachusetts selectmen
Harvard College alumni